Anchor Button (Spanish: Botón de ancla) is a 1948 Spanish comedy film directed by Ramón Torrado and starring Antonio Casal, Jorge Mistral and Isabel de Pomés. The plot focuses on three students at the Spanish naval academy. It was remade in 1961.

Cast
    Antonio Casal as José Luis Bahamonde  
 Jorge Mistral as Carlos Corbián  
 Isabel de Pomés as María Rosa  
 Fernando Fernán Gómez as Enrique Tejada y Sandoval  
 Fernando Fernández de Córdoba 
 Félix Fernández as Comandante segundo  
 Mary Santpere as Señorita #1  
 Linda Tamoa 
 María Isbert as Señorita #2 
 Xan das Bolas as Trinquete  
 José de Caparrós  
 Encarna Paso 
 Alicia Romay

References

Bibliography 
 Bentley, Bernard. A Companion to Spanish Cinema. Boydell & Brewer, 2008.

External links 
 

1948 comedy films
Spanish comedy films
1948 films
1940s Spanish-language films
Films directed by Ramón Torrado
Spanish black-and-white films
1940s Spanish films